Ashu Trikha is an Indian film director and producer of Bollywood. He started his career with Arjun Rampal movie Deewaanapan which was produced by Vashu Bhagnani's. Sheesha in 2005, followed by Mithun Chakraborty movie Zindagi Tere Naam which also saw the return of Ranjeeta Kaur to Bollywood. His next venture Baabarr had Mithun and Om Puri  followed by Mithun Chakraborty's home production Enemmy with an ensemble cast of Mithun Chakraborty, Sunil Shetty, Mahakshay Chakraborty, Kay Kay Menon and Zakir Hussain.

Trikha's new film Koyelaanchal shows the dark side of coal mafia.

Filmography

References
http://www.bollywoodhungama.com/celebritymicro/index/id/686

External links

Living people
Film directors from Mumbai
Hindi-language film directors
21st-century Indian film directors
1963 births